Lindsay Davenport defeated Steffi Graf in the final, 6–4, 7–5 to win the ladies' singles tennis title at the 1999 Wimbledon Championships. Davenport did not drop a set during the tournament. This was the final major in which Graf appeared; she was also attempting to complete the Channel Slam.

Jana Novotná was the defending champion, but lost in the quarterfinals to Davenport.

This tournament saw a number of surprises, including world No. 129 & qualifier Jelena Dokic's first-round defeat of world No. 1 Martina Hingis, ending Hingis' streak of 11 major semifinals (dating to the 1996 US Open). This tournament also saw Alexandra Stevenson become only the second qualifier (after Christine Matison in the 1978 Australian Open) to reach the semifinals of a major in the Open Era.

This tournament marked the major debut of future world No. 1 Kim Clijsters; she lost to Graf in the fourth round.

Mirjana Lučić, who reached the semifinals, did not reach another major semifinal until the 2017 Australian Open.

Seeds

  Martina Hingis (first round)
  Steffi Graf (final)
  Lindsay Davenport (champion)
  Monica Seles (third round)
  Jana Novotná (quarterfinals)
  Venus Williams (quarterfinals)
  Arantxa Sánchez Vicario (second round)
  Nathalie Tauziat (quarterfinals)
  Mary Pierce (fourth round)
  Serena Williams (withdrew)
  Julie Halard-Decugis (third round)
  Amanda Coetzer (third round)
  Sandrine Testud (third round)
  Barbara Schett (fourth round)
  Dominique Van Roost (fourth round)
  Natasha Zvereva (second round)
  Anna Kournikova (fourth round)

Serena Williams withdrew due to a flu and high fever. She was replaced in the draw by the highest-ranked non-seeded player Anna Kournikova, who became the #17 seed.

Qualifying

Draw

Finals

Top half

Section 1

Section 2

Section 3

Section 4

Bottom half

Section 5

Section 6

Section 7

Section 8

References

External links

1999 Wimbledon Championships on WTAtennis.com
1999 Wimbledon Championships – Women's draws and results at the International Tennis Federation

Women's Singles
Wimbledon Championship by year – Women's singles
Wimbledon Championships
Wimbledon Championships